Bowe Hill is a mountain in the Central New York Region of New York. It is located in the Town of Hartwick, southwest of Arnold Lake and northeast of Mount Vision. It was once referred to as Rye Hill due to the large quantities of cereal grain grown on its slopes.

References

Mountains of Otsego County, New York
Mountains of New York (state)